Zee TV is a general entertainment channel in Russian launched in July 2007. Zee TV Russia airs Zee TV and &TV series dubbed into Russian and movies from Bollywood. Its target audience is the Indian diaspora.

Television programs 
 Agent Raghav – Crime Branch (Agent Raghav)
 Chotti Bahu 2 (GOD Given)
 Buddha (Buddha)
 Fear Files: Darr Ki Sacchi Tasvirein (In The Power of Fear)
 Punar Vivah (The second wedding)
 Do Dil Bandhe Ek Dori Se (Two Hearts, One Fate)
 Jodha Akbar (Jodha and Akbar: The Story of Great Love)
 Yahan Ke Hum Sikandar (Road to Life)
 Aapki Antara (Other)
 Kumkum Bhagya (Female Share)
 Khelti Hai Zindagi Aankh Micholi (Life Is Full of Surprises)
 Tashan-e-Ishq (Forbidden Love)
 Rabba Ishq Na Hove (Evil Love)
 Ek Thi Rajkumaari (The Golden Cage)
 Jhansi Ki Rani (Queen Jhansi)
 Pyaar Tune Kya Kiya (Love The Whole Cause)
 Do Saheliyaan (Puppets of Fate)
 Connected Hum Tum (We Are Women!)
 Parvaaz (On the verge)
 Banoo Main Teri Dulhann (Daughter in Law)
 Kasamh Se (Promise)
 Ek Tha Raja Ek Thi Rani (One King One Queen)
 Simply Sapney (Simple Dreams)
 Sanjog Se Bani Sangini (Random Love)
 Qubool Hai (Consent)
 Bhabi Ji Ghar Par Hai! (Neighbor, Are You At Home?)
 Razia Sultan (Sultan Razia)
 Jhoome Jiiya Re (I Want To Dance)
 Dil Se Diya Vachan (The Keeper of The Hearth)
 Ardhangini (A Pure Soul)
 Sapne Suhane Ladakpan Ke (The Young Years Are Wonderful)
 Yahaaan Main Ghar Ghar Kheli (I Grew Up Here)

References

External links
 

Zee Entertainment Enterprises
Russian-language television stations in Russia
Television channels and stations established in 2007
2007 establishments in Russia